Tiberius Claudius Caesar Britannicus (12 February AD 41 – 11 February AD 55), usually called Britannicus, was the son of Roman emperor Claudius and his third wife Valeria Messalina. For a time he was considered his father's heir, but that changed after his mother's downfall in 48, when it was revealed she had engaged in a bigamous marriage without Claudius' knowledge. The next year, his father married Agrippina the Younger, Claudius' fourth and final marriage. Their marriage was followed by the adoption of Agrippina's son, Lucius Domitius, whose name became Nero as a result. His step-brother would later be married to Britannicus' sister Octavia, and soon eclipsed him as Claudius' heir. Following his father's death in October 54, Nero became emperor. The sudden death of Britannicus shortly before his fourteenth birthday is reported by all extant sources as being the result of poisoning on Nero's orders – as Claudius' biological son, he represented a threat to Nero's claim to the throne.

Name
Britannicus' name at birth was Tiberius Claudius Germanicus. The agnomen, his first surname Germanicus, was first awarded to his paternal grandfather Drusus the Elder after his death in 9 BC to commemorate his victories over the Germanic tribes. Accordingly, Drusus' sons (Claudius and Germanicus) inherited the name and passed it to their sons as well. Britannicus was given to his father in AD 43 following his conquest of Britain. Claudius never used it himself and gave the name to his son instead, and his full name became: Tiberius Claudius Caesar Britannicus. He came to be known by his new name which seems to have replaced Germanicus altogether.

Background and family

Britannicus was born on or about 12 February 41 in Rome, to Emperor Claudius and his third wife Valeria Messalina. As such, he was a member of the Julio-Claudian dynasty, specifically of the gens Claudia. Britannicus' father had been reigning for less than a month, and his position was boosted greatly by the birth of an heir. To mark the birth, the emperor issued sestertii with the obverse Spes Augusta – the hope of the imperial family.

Britannicus had four siblings: a half-brother, Claudius Drusus, by Claudius' first wife (Plautia Urgulanilla) who died before Britannicus was born; a half-sister, Antonia, by Claudius' second wife (Aelia Paetina); a sister by the same mother named Octavia; and an adoptive brother, Lucius Domitius Ahenobarbus (the future emperor Nero), who was adopted in AD 49 and renamed Nero Claudius Caesar as a result.

Two years later, in 43, Claudius was granted the honorific "Britannicus" by the senate as a reward for his conquest of Britain. The emperor never used the name himself, but allowed his son to inherit it. This is the name by which the boy became known to posterity. Gaius Suetonius Tranquillus, a Roman historian writing from the late first century, says that Claudius adored Britannicus, carrying him around at public events, and "would wish him happy auspices, joined by the applauding throng."

During his father's marriage to Messalina

Education
Britannicus was tutored by Sosibius, who was a close associate of Publius Suillius Rufus and a friend of his mother. He was educated alongside Titus Vespasianus, the future emperor of Rome. They were brought up together and taught similar subjects by the same tutors.

In 47, Sosibius gave Claudius a reminder of the power and wealth which threatened the Emperor's throne. His tutor then, as part of his mother's contrivances, told the emperor of Decimus Valerius Asiaticus's involvement in the murder of Caligula and of his growing popularity in Rome. Sosibius went on, saying Asiaticus meant to rally Roman legions in Germany against the throne. Asiaticus was apprehended immediately, and brought to Rome in chains. Sullius successfully pursued charges against other equestrians in the Senate. According to Cassius Dio, Asiaticus was put to death as a favor to Messalina for his property (the Gardens of Lucullus).

It was later voted by the Senate that Sosibius be given a million sesterces for giving Britannicus the benefit of his teachings and Claudius that of his counsel (i.e. for his involvement in the case against Asiaticus).

Fall of Messalina

Britannicus took part in the celebrations of Rome's 800th anniversary (in the year 48). It was the sixth ever Ludi Saeculares ("Secular Games") and sixty-four years since the last one held in the summer of 17 BC by Augustus. Britannicus' father was there, as was Lucius Domitius and his mother Agrippina, the last two surviving descendants of Germanicus. Claudius watched the young nobility, including Britannicus and Domitius, enact the Battle of Troy in the circus. Tacitus says Domitius was greeted with more enthusiasm than Britannicus.

The games were seen as the introduction of Agrippina and Domitius to public life, and Britannicus' mother Messalina must have been aware of this and envious of Agrippina. Tacitus writes that Messalina was too busy engaging in an "insane" affair to plot the destruction of Agrippina. He says:

The affair continued into the next year. It was then that the affair between Messalina and Silius took a new turn. Silius, who had no children of his own, proposed to marry Messalina on condition that she allow him to adopt Britannicus. The plan was to overthrow Claudius and rule together as regents of Britannicus. She acquiesced and waited for Claudius to leave Rome before performing the sacrifice and entering the bigamous marriage. The illegal union was made known to Claudius by Callistus and Narcissus, freedmen in his service. Claudius had Messalina, Silius, and others who knew of the affair put to death. Messalina was given a knife to kill herself with, though a tribune of the Praetorian Guard had to force it through her neck. Images and statues of Silius and his associates were ordered to be destroyed.

During his father's marriage to Agrippina
The fall of Silius and Messalina opened the way for Agrippina the Younger to become his father's fourth wife. His father claimed to be uninterested in another marriage, but it was not long until he remarried. Unlike his uncle Germanicus, his father had never been adopted into the Julii. Claudius thought marrying his niece would bring his family closer to that of Augustus, as Agrippina and Domitius were the last living descendants of Germanicus. So, in 49, despite a marriage between uncle and niece being incestuous under Roman law, his father remarried. Agrippina guided Claudius even more easily than Messalina, and as a daughter of Germanicus and a descendant of Augustus, she became very popular among soldiers and the people. In short, Agrippina's rise to power was due to the emperor's obedience to her and her excellent bloodline and strong political connections.

Rise of Nero

Thanks to a strong mother like Agrippina, an ambitious, experienced and charismatic woman, who was powerful and eloquent at court, the rise of Nero was both fast and unstoppable. In 49, during the term of consul-elect Mammius Pollio (March–June), Domitius was betrothed to his sister Octavia and thus became his equal in rank. Tacitus suggests this move had the support of those who feared the vengeance of Britannicus against those who wronged his mother.

Through the insistence of Pallas, his father was convinced to adopt Domitius as his son. Claudius was convinced to do as Augustus had done in adopting Gaius and Lucius Caesar, and as Tiberius had done in adopting Germanicus despite having a son already. It was in February 50 that his father passed a law adopting Domitius into the Claudii and naming him Nero, and Domitius became "Nero Claudius Caesar". Nero and Britannicus then became joint-heirs to the emperor, and Agrippina was then given the honorable and high-ranking title of Augusta.

In AD 51, his brother Nero assumed the toga virilis despite not yet being 14. The Senate also decided then that Nero should hold the consulship during his twentieth year (AD 56) and, as consul-elect, that he should enjoy imperium proconsulare ("proconsular authority") beyond the limits of Rome with the title of princeps iuventutis ("prince of the youth of Rome"). The progress of Nero seems to have followed in the footsteps of Gaius and Lucius Caesar. To mark the occasion, a donative was given to the soldiery of Rome, and presents to the people. His step-brother's status, along with that of Agrippina, is echoed on contemporary coinage.

By contrast, Britannicus was progressively isolated. At the games of the circus Nero appeared in triumphal robes while Britannicus was still dressed as a boy. Tacitus says their clothing at the games affected the expectations of the people: with Nero in a general's clothing, and Britannicus in the dress of boyhood. He was not due for the toga until 12 February AD 55. He and his supporters were seen as a potential problem for Nero. Agrippina replaced his tutors with her own nominees, having convinced Claudius to order their executions, including the execution of Sosibius. Not just his tutors, but the two prefects of the Praetorian Guard, Lusius Geta and Rufius Crispinus, were replaced as well. They were thought to be sympathetic to the cause of Britannicus and his mother, as Tacitus reports: it would have been risky to surround Nero with any but those loyal to Claudius and Agrippina. His step-mother had them replaced with Sextus Afranius Burrus who was a good soldier, but knew to whom he owed his allegiance.

Nero's career progressed steadily: he gave speeches in AD 51 and 52. The speech in 51 thanked the emperor for honours given to him, and that of 52 was a vow for the safe recovery of the emperor from illness. It was in 53 that Nero married Britannicus' sister Octavia, who first had to be legally transferred to another family to obviate charges of incest. By this time it became clear that Nero was the unambiguous designate. His step-brother became more politically active following his marriage to Octavia: he exempted the people of Ilium from all public burdens arguing that Rome was descended from Troy through Aeneas (the founder of the Julian line), procured funds for the colony of Bononia (modern Bologna, Italy) which had been devastated by fire, and the people of Rhodes had their freedom restored.

Meanwhile, Britannicus himself was kept in reserve in case Nero died, with deaths of princes being recent (such as Tiberius Gemellus). Though Nero was clearly the heir-designate, he was not named princeps designate to avoid hurting both Republican sentiment and the Augustan compromise of a principate that lay between monarchy and magistracy.

Death of his father, Claudius
Suetonius reports that Claudius wished Rome to have a "real Caesar", and Britannicus enjoyed support from Claudius' loyal and influential freedman, Narcissus. There are possible signs of support for Britannicus seen on coins from Moesia and North Africa, placing Britannicus' head and title on the obverse side. Claudius became aware of his wife's actions and began preparing for the end of her power. His father wished to bestow upon him the toga, and to declare Britannicus as his heir. According to Suetonius, when Claudius mentioned his intention to give Britannicus the toga of manhood he said, "That the Roman people may at last have a genuine Caesar."

The actions Claudius took to preserve his rule in the short-term were not easily undone as Britannicus approached manhood. In late 54, Britannicus was within 6 months of reaching manhood by Roman tradition, and had matured early. According to the historian Suetonius, Claudius began to mention divorcing Agrippina and dismissing Nero now that he was no longer needed. Despite his many conflicts with Agrippina and demanding her ouster,  Agrippina was still administering the empire as the very powerful and influential daughter of Germanicus and Roman Empress. Claudius commended both his son and adopted son to the Senate as equals in his last Senate address. Suetonius reports that Claudius now admonished his son to grow up quickly, implying that everything would be righted when he assumed the toga virilis.

On 13 October 54, Claudius died, either by natural causes or poison. In the accounts of his death by poison, Agrippina, aware of Claudius' intentions of placing Britannicus on the throne, had a well-known poisoner, Locusta, infuse mushrooms with poison that were fed to the emperor.

There were those who preferred Britannicus over Nero, such as Claudius' freedman Narcissus. Unfortunately for his cause, Narcissus was away in Campania when the emperor was poisoned, while Britannicus and his sisters, Octavia and Antonia, were kept out of sight in their rooms by Agrippina. Consequently, none could challenge Nero's succession. If one thought that Britannicus' claim should take precedence, the response was that Nero too was the son of Claudius, with Agrippina linking him back to Augustus. It didn't help that many were convinced that Britannicus was no longer in the line of succession, a direct effect of the propaganda against him by Agrippina. Nero spoke the eulogy at the emperor's funeral and took sole power. Claudius' new will, which either granted joint-rule to Britannicus and Nero or just Britannicus, was suppressed by the new emperor's men in the senate.

Downfall

Immediately following the death of Claudius, Agrippina set upon removing those she had seen as a threat. Marcus Junius Silanus, proconsul of Asia whose brother Lucius had been eliminated by her as well, was poisoned for no other reason than that he had been the great-great-grandson of Augustus. Claudius' freedman Narcissus, Britannicus' champion according to Tacitus, had been driven to suicide after a harsh imprisonment. In Tacitus XIII, this was carried out by Agrippina against the wishes of Nero.

Before Nero's consulship in 55, Nero forbade the persecution of a Julius Densus, an equestrian whose partiality for Britannicus had been construed as a crime.

During his consulship, Nero had become more independent from his mother's influence. He began a relationship with a slave girl, and removed Pallas, a favorite of Agrippina, from his post as secretary of the treasury. In response, Agrippina threatened to champion the cause of Britannicus to keep her son in line. In the account of Tacitus, Agrippina says to Nero:

Tacitus recounts Nero's numerous attempts to publicly undermine Britannicus' image. In one such attempt, during the feast of Saturn (the Saturnalia), he and Nero were playing a game among a group of their friends, and Nero chose Britannicus to sing a song with the expectation that Britannicus would embarrass himself. Britannicus however, not only avoided humiliation, but also generated sympathy amongst the guests, after singing a poem telling the tale of how he had been cast aside in favour of Nero. The young emperor immediately began plotting his step-brother's assassination.

According to Suetonius, Nero moved against Britannicus, employing the same poisoner, Locusta, who had been hired to murder his father, Claudius. The first dose failed, and Nero decided to throw caution to the wind. In the account of Suetonius, he had Locusta brought to his room to mix a faster acting poison before his very eyes. After many tests on kids, there was a mixture that killed an animal instantly. Being pleased, Nero had the concoction brought immediately to the dining room.

Britannicus was poisoned at a dinner party attended by his sister, Octavia, Agrippina, and several other notables. Tacitus' account of the event is as follows: Britannicus was given a hot drink, which was tested by a food taster, and when he asked for it to be cooled, the poison was added to it with the cold water. The substance was instantly effective, and he "lost alike both voice and breath."  Nero claimed to those present that Britannicus was merely experiencing an epileptic seizure, and that he had been affected by the condition since childhood. He died sometime between December 54 and 11 February 55, the day before his 14th birthday when he was to assume manhood, just four months after his father's death. For her service, the emperor had Locusta rewarded with large estates, and even sent her pupils.

There is a theory that Britannicus was not poisoned, but died of a seizure.

Post mortem
Britannicus was cremated and his ashes placed with those of his father in the Mausoleum of Augustus. Nero held his funeral the very next day in the rain and gave no eulogy, saying it was "a tradition in the case of untimely deaths not to oppress the public with eulogies and processions." Dio says that Nero had the corpse covered in gypsum to cover the effects of the poison on the skin. While he was being carried through the Forum, the rain had uncovered the body making plain to all who could see that he had been poisoned. Author and historian Beacham considers Dio's account to be "theatrical".

Given his and Nero's relationship, it was not surprising when Britannicus died just before his fourteenth birthday. Britannicus criticized Nero's singing voice, and referred to his adoptive brother by his original name of Lucius Domitius. In favoring Nero, Claudius sealed the fate of his son, and perhaps his own. Ominously for Agrippina, Seneca and Burrus did not complain: either they had been bought off, or regarded Britannicus' death as inevitable given his relationship with Nero. Instead, they concentrated on growing their influence with the new emperor.

According to Suetonius, Britannicus was good friends with the future Emperor Titus, whose father Vespasian had commanded legions in Britain. As part of the Flavians' attempts to link themselves with the Julio-Claudians, Titus claimed that he had been seated with Britannicus on the night he was killed. He even claimed to have tasted the poison, which resulted in a serious and long illness. Titus would go on to erect a gold statue of his childhood friend, and issue coins in his memory.

Cultural depictions
Britannicus is portrayed in Britannicus (1669) by French playwright Jean Racine.

He was played by Graham Seed in I, Claudius, a 1976 television series by Jack Pulman.

Notes

References

Bibliography

Primary sources
Dio Cassius. Historia Romanum. Books LX–LXII.
Suetonius. Twelve Caesars. Life of Claudius.
Suetonius. Twelve Caesars. Life of Titus.
Tacitus. Annals. Books XI–XIII.

Secondary sources
 
 
 
 
 
 
 
 
 
 
 
 
 
 
 
Girolamo Cardano Neronis Encomium Translated by Angelo Paratico as Nero. An Exemplary Life. Inkstone Books, 2012.

External links
 Britannicus de Jean Racine : Analysis, Plot overview 
 Britannicus de Jean Racine in a new translation by Timberlake Wertenbaker

41 births
55 deaths
Poisoned Romans
Claudii Nerones
1st-century Romans
Children of Claudius
Sons of Roman emperors
Murdered children
Non-inheriting heirs presumptive